Pavlo Isenko (born 21 July 2003) is a Ukrainian professional footballer who plays as a goalkeeper for Vorskla Poltava in the Ukrainian Premier League.

Career 
Isenko is a product of FC Vorskla Youth Sportive School from his native Poltava. In May 2019 he had his first appearance on the bench of the Vorska in its game against FC Chornomorets Odesa, though he did not play in this game. In June 2020 Isenko was promoted to the main-squad team of FC Vorskla. 

He made his debut as a substituted player instead of Dmytro Riznyk for Vorskla Poltava in the semifinal Ukrainian Cup match against FC Mariupol on 24 June 2020 and came on the field in the 119th minute, before the penalty shootout. In it, the 16-year-old goalkeeper hit 3 out of 5 shots, helping his team win 3:2 on penalties and reach the 2020 Ukrainian Cup Final.

International career
In 2019, Isenko was called up to the Ukraine national under-17 football team, with which he participated in the qualifying matches for the youth Euro 2020 in Estonia, but later the tournament was canceled due to the coronavirus pandemic.

References

External links 
 

2003 births
Living people
Sportspeople from Poltava
Ukrainian footballers
FC Vorskla Poltava players
Association football goalkeepers
Ukrainian Premier League players
Ukraine youth international footballers